Philip the Evangelist (Philippos) appears several times in the Acts of the Apostles.  He was one of the Seven chosen to care for the poor of the Christian community in Jerusalem. He preached and reportedly performed miracles in Samaria, and met and baptised an Ethiopian man, a eunuch, on the road from Jerusalem to Gaza, traditionally marking the start of the Ethiopian Church. Later, Philip lived in Caesarea Maritima with his four daughters who prophesied, where he was visited by Paul the Apostle.

New Testament
Philip bore a Greek name. He is first mentioned in the Acts of the Apostles as one of "Seven Deacons" who were chosen to attend to certain temporal affairs of the church in Jerusalem in consequence of the murmurings of the Hellenists against the Hebrews.

After the martyrdom of Stephen he went to "the city of Samaria", where he preached with much success, Simon Magus being one of his converts. He afterwards was told by an angel of the Lord to go to the road between Jerusalem and Gaza. There he instructed and baptized the Ethiopian eunuch; next he was "caught away" by the Spirit and "found at Azotus" (Ashdod); and then "passing through he preached in all the cities till he came to Caesarea" (Acts 8).

Tradition

At a very early period he came to be confused with the Philip the Apostle; the confusion was all the more easy because, as an esteemed member of the apostolic company, he may readily have been described as an apostle in the wider sense of that word, beyond the original 12 Apostles. A late tradition describes him as settling at Tralles in Anatolia, where he became the bishop of that church.

"St Philip the Deacon" is commemorated on October 11 in the Eastern Orthodox Church, in the Roman Rite, the Lutheran Church–Missouri Synod, and in the Anglican communion including, for example, the U.S. Episcopal Church, and the  Anglican Church of Southern Africa.  Additionally, in the Eastern Orthodox Church, Philip is counted among the Seventy Apostles, and is referred to as a Protodeacon; this feast day is celebrated on January 4.

Notes

External links

Apostle Philip the Deacon of the Seventy Orthodox icon and synaxarion
Who is St. Philip the Evangelist
IVP New Testament Commentary on Philip in Acts 8

Angelic visionaries
Early Jewish Christians
Christian saints from the New Testament
People in Acts of the Apostles
Prophets of the New Testament
1st-century Jews
Saints from the Holy Land
Seventy disciples
Anglican saints